Gortahurk ( and) is a townland lying within the civil parish of Kilcronaghan, County Londonderry, Northern Ireland. It lies on the extreme south-west of the parish on the boundary with the parish of Ballynascreen. It is bounded by the townlands of Brackaghlislea, Coolsaragh, Drumard, Keenaght, Letteran, Straw Mountain, Tintagh, and Tullyroan. It was apportioned to the Drapers company.

The townland was part of Tobermore electoral ward of the former Magherafelt District Council, however in 1901 and 1926 it was part of Iniscarn district electoral division as part of the Draperstown dispensary (registrar's) district of Magherafelt Rural District. It was also part of the historic barony of Loughinsholin.

Etymology
Gortahurk derives its name from the Irish Gort an Choirce meaning "field of the oats". Two of the earliest recordings of this townland however—GortyIchorchy (1609) and Gort Okorte (1613)—suggest that the scribe felt that the final element of the name Gortahurk was a surname. This is testified by the use of the capital I in GortyIchorchy and the capital O in Okorte, both of which represent the Irish surname prefix Ui. Despite this no suitable surname is attested to in any of the major works on Irish surnames.

History

See also
Kilcronaghan
List of townlands in Tobermore
Tobermore

References

Townlands of County Londonderry
Civil parish of Kilcronaghan